Cosmas Indicopleustes (also known as Cosmas the Monk) was a Greek merchant and later hermit from  Alexandria of Egypt. He was a 6th-century traveller who made several voyages to India during the reign of emperor Justinian. His work Christian Topography contained some of the earliest and most famous world maps.
Cosmas was a pupil of the East Syriac Patriarch Aba I and was himself a follower of the Church of the East.

Voyage
Around AD 550, while a monk in the retirement of a Sinai cloister, Cosmas wrote the once-copiously illustrated Christian Topography, a work partly based on his personal experiences as a merchant on the Red Sea and Indian Ocean in the early 6th century. His description of India and Ceylon during the 6th century is invaluable to historians. Cosmas seems to have personally visited the Kingdom of Axum in modern day northern Ethiopia, as well as Eritrea. He sailed along the coast of Socotra, but it cannot be ascertained that he really visited India and Ceylon.

Indicopleustes
"Indicopleustes" means "Indian voyager", from  "(I) sail". While it is known from classical literature, especially the Periplus Maris Erythraei, that there had been trade between the Roman Empire and India from the first century BC onwards, Cosmas's report is one of the few from individuals who had actually made the journey. He described and sketched some of what he saw in his Topography. Some of these have been copied into the existing manuscripts, the oldest dating to the 9th century. In 522 AD, he mentions several ports of trade on the Malabar Coast (South India). He is the first traveller to mention Soriyani Christians in present-day Kerala in India. He wrote, "In the Island of Taprobane (Ceylon), there is a church of the Christians, and clerks and faithful. Likewise at Malé where the pepper grows; and in the town of Kalliana, there is also a bishop consecrated in Persia."

Christian Topography

A major feature of his Christian Topography is his worldview that the world is flat and that the heavens form the shape of a box with a curved lid. He was scornful of Ptolemy and others who held that the world was spherical. Cosmas aimed to prove that pre-Christian geographers had been wrong in asserting that the earth was spherical and that it was in fact modelled on the tabernacle, the house of worship described to Moses by God during the Jewish Exodus from Egypt. In the centre of the plane is the inhabited earth, surrounded by ocean, beyond which lies the paradise of Adam. The sun revolves round a conical mountain to the north: round the summit in summer, round the base in winter, which accounts for the difference in the length of the day.

However, his idea that the earth is flat had been a minority view among educated Western opinion since the 3rd century BC. Cosmas's view was never influential even in religious circles; a near-contemporary Christian, John Philoponus, disagreed with him as did many Christian philosophers of the era.

David C. Lindberg asserts: "Cosmas was not particularly influential in Byzantium, but he is important for us because he has been commonly used to buttress the claim that all (or most) medieval people believed they lived on a flat earth. This claim...is totally false. Cosmas is, in fact, the only medieval European known to have defended a flat earth cosmology, whereas it is safe to assume that all educated Western Europeans (and almost one hundred percent of educated Byzantines), as well as sailors and travelers, believed in the earth's sphericity."

Cosmology aside, Cosmas proves to be an interesting and reliable guide, providing a window into a world that has since disappeared. He happened to be in Adulis on the Red Sea Coast of modern Eritrea at the time (c. AD 525) when the King of Axum was preparing a military expedition to attack the Jewish king Dhu Nuwas in Yemen, who had recently been persecuting Christians. On request of the Axumite king and in preparation for this campaign, he recorded now-vanished inscriptions such as the Monumentum Adulitanum (which he mistakenly attributed to Ptolemy III Euergetes). Allusions in the Topography suggest that Cosmas was also the author of a larger cosmography, a treatise on the motions of the stars, and commentaries on the Psalms and Canticles.

See also
Chronology of European exploration of Asia

References

Further reading
 Kenneth Willis Clark collection of Greek Manuscripts: Cosmas Indicopleustes, Topographia.
 Cosmas Indicopleustes, ed. John Watson McCrindle (1897). The Christian Topography of Cosmas, an Egyptian Monk. Hakluyt Society. (Reissued by Cambridge University Press, 2010. )
 Cosmas Indicopleustes, Eric Otto Winstedt (1909). The Christian Topography of Cosmas Indicopleustes. The University Press
 Jeffrey Burton Russell (1997). Inventing the Flat Earth. Praeger Press
 Dr. Jerry H Bentley (2005). Traditions and Encounters. McGraw Hill.
 Wanda Wolska-Conus. La topographie chrétienne de Cosmas Indicopleustes: théologie et sciences au VIe siècle Vol. 3, Bibliothèque Byzantine. Paris: Presses Universitaires de France, 1962.
 Cosmas Indicopleustes. Cosmas Indicopleustès, Topographie chrétienne. Translated by Wanda Wolska-Conus. 3 vols. Paris: Les Editions du Cerf, 1968–1973.

External links
The Christian Topography by Cosmas Indicopleustes
The Christian Topography by Cosmas Indicopleustes (other site)
Greek Opera Omnia by Migne Patrologia Graeca with analytical indexes
Scan of the entire Codex Vat.gr.699 on Biblioteca Apostolica Vaticana website

This article uses text taken from the Preface to the Online English translation of the Christian Topography, which is in the public domain.

Byzantine geographers
Explorers of Asia
6th-century Byzantine monks
6th-century Byzantine writers
Greek explorers
6th-century Byzantine scientists
Flat Earth proponents
Church of the East
6th-century geographers
Explorers of India